Aleksandr Glebov (born 15 July 1983) is a Russian alpine skier. He has competed at the 2014 Winter Olympics in Sochi.

References

External links
https://data.fis-ski.com/dynamic/athlete-biography.html?sector=AL&listid=&competitorid=172524

1983 births
Russian male alpine skiers
Alpine skiers at the 2014 Winter Olympics
Olympic alpine skiers of Russia
Living people
Place of birth missing (living people)